Judo was contested at the 2017 Summer Universiade from August 20 to 24 at the Hsinchu County Gymansium in Zhubei, Hsinchu County, Taiwan.

Medal summary

Medal table

Men's events

Women's events

References

External links
 
 2017 Summer Universiade – Judo
 Result book – Judo

Universiade
2017 Summer Universiade events
2017